Major General Francis Raymond Gage Matthews CB DSO (26 January 1903 – 26 May 1976) was a British Army officer who served in the Second World War and later was Commander of British Forces in Hong Kong.

Military career
After graduating from the Royal Military College, Sandhurst, Matthews was commissioned into the York and Lancaster Regiment on 1 February 1923. He transferred to the South Wales Borderers in 1935 while aide-de-camp to the Governor and Commander-in-Chief of Malta. He served in Palestine during the Arab revolt in Palestine, for which he was later mentioned in dispatches, before returning to the United Kingdom where he attended the Staff College, Camberley from 1937 to 1938.

He served in the Second World War initially as a General Staff Officer and then as Commanding Officer of a battalion within the Mediterranean Expeditionary Force. He went on to become Director of Military Training for the Middle East in 1943, Commander of 168th Brigade in May 1944 and then Commander of 13th Brigade in Italy in September 1944. After that he became Commander of 185th Brigade in North West Europe in January 1945 and then General Officer Commanding 53rd (Welsh) Infantry Division in Germany in November 1945.

After the War he became Commandant of the Royal Military Academy Sandhurst in June 1946, Commander of British Forces in Hong Kong in June 1948 and President of the Regular Commissions Board at the War Office in August 1949. He went on to be General Officer Commanding 1st Infantry Division in December 1950, Director of Infantry at the War Office in December 1952 and Director of Civil Defence for Wales in 1956. His last appointments were as Commandant of the Civil Defence Staff College in 1956 and Director of Civil Defence for the South West Region in 1960.

He was also Colonel of the South Wales Borderers from 1954 to 1961.

References

External links
British Army Officers 1939−1945
Generals of World War II

|-

|-

|-

|-

1903 births
1976 deaths
British Army major generals
British Army brigadiers of World War II
British military personnel of the 1936–1939 Arab revolt in Palestine
Commandants of Sandhurst
Companions of the Distinguished Service Order
Companions of the Order of the Bath
Graduates of the Royal Military College, Sandhurst
Graduates of the Staff College, Camberley
People educated at Cheltenham College
South Wales Borderers officers
York and Lancaster Regiment officers